The 1982 Audi Men's World Open Squash Championship is the men's edition of the 1982 World Open, which serves as the individual world championship for squash players. The event took place in the National Exhibition Centre, Birmingham in England from the quarter final stage onwards. The event lasted from 6 November until 16 November 1982. Jahangir Khan won his second consecutive World Open title, defeating Dean Williams in the final.

The early rounds were held at squash clubs throughout cities and towns in Britain including matches in Colwyn Bay, Blackpool, Bradford, Leeds, Wanstead, Basingstoke, Ilkeston and Colchester.

Seeds

First round

Draw and results

Notes
The tournament was held at the NEC in Birmingham from the quarter finals stage.

See also
PSA World Open

References

External links
World Squash History

M
World Squash Championships
Squash tournaments in the United Kingdom
Squash in England
1982 in English sport
International sports competitions in Birmingham, West Midlands